Cato Networks is a Tel Aviv, Israel-based network security company that develops Secure Access Service Edge (SASE) technology, which combines enterprise communication and security capabilities onto a single cloud-based platform. The company was founded in 2015. After an October 2021 funding round, the company was a tech unicorn valued at $2.5 billion.

History
Cato Networks was founded in 2015 in Tel Aviv, Israel by Shlomo Kramer, co-founder of Checkpoint and Imperva, and Gur Shatz, a co-founder of networking company Incapsula. Cato was initially funded with a $20 million Series A from U.S. Venture Partners and Aspect Ventures.  Kramer became CEO, and Shatz became president and COO. It secured a Series B round of $50 million in September.

The company officially launched in February 2016. Its first products were designed to protect customer's WAN connections and mobile devices with services including next-generation firewalling, URL filtering, application control and VPN access.

In June 2018, the company added threat hunting capabilities to its networking service.

In 2019, the company secured a $55 million Series C funding round.

In April 2020, the company raised $77 million in a Series D. In November, the company announced a $130 million Series E funding round, led by return investors Lightspeed Partners, with participation from Greylock Partners, U.S. Venture Partners, Aspect Capital, Singaporean fund Singtel's subsidiary Innov8, and hedge fund Coatue Management. The investment reportedly valued the company at over $1 billion, making it a tech unicorn.

In June 2021, the company launched a new version of its managed detection and response (MDR) platform, used to detect security threats on its network. In October, the company announced it had raised $200 million at a $2.5 billion valuation.  The round was led by Lightspeed Venture Partners with the participation of existing investors Greylock, Acrew Capital, Coatue, Singtel Innov8, and CEO Kramer.

In February 2022, the company added cloud access security broker (CASB) capabilities to protect cloud applications. Also in February, the company announced it was planning on going public within the next two years.

Products
Cato Networks develops a Secure Access Service Edge (SASE) platform, which combines SD-WAN, managed security service and global backbone services into a cloud-based service offering. Its products are designed to help IT staff manage network security for distributed workforces accessing resources across the wide area networks (WANs), cloud and Internet that connects them.  The company's Cato SASE Cloud platform supports more than 73 points of presence over 150 countries. The company's managed detection and response (MDR) platform combines machine learning and artificial intelligence (AI) models to process network traffic data and identify threats to its customers. The company also offers cloud access security broker (CASB) capabilities to protect cloud applications.

Operations
The company is headquartered in Tel Aviv, Israel. As of February 2022, the company reported over 1,100 customers which it served from 73 points-of-presence worldwide.  Also as of February 2022, the company reported 500 employees.

Shlomo Kramer is the company's CEO, and Gur Shatz is its president and COO.

See also
Edge computing
SD-WAN
Secure access service edge

References

External links
 

Computer security companies
Computer security software companies
Software companies established in 2015
Israeli brands
Software companies of Israel
Companies based in Tel Aviv
2015 establishments in Israel